The Code of Offences and Penalties (French: Code des délits et des peines) was a criminal code adopted in revolutionary France by the National Convention on 25 October 1795 (the 3rd of Brumaire of the year IV under the French Republican Calendar).

This distinction is still in force today and is a functional distinction, which does not necessarily imply an organizational separation: a single organization may be charged with carrying out both types of police functions: one example is the National Gendarmerie.

It is notable for suppressing afflictive penalties, with the exception of the death penalty, and for creating prison sentences, the harshest of which is known as the Peine de la Gêne, and consists of a fifty-year imprisonment in a windowless cell without any possibility of communication with either outside persons or inmates.

See also 
 French criminal law

External links 

French criminal law
Legal history of France
1795 events of the French Revolution
Criminal codes
1795 in law